Eduard Theodor von Falz-Fein (4 June 1912 – 17 June 1974) was a Liechtensteiner bobsledder who competed in the 1936 Olympic Games, in the two man bobsleigh. He was born in Berlin and was a cousin of Eduard Oleg Alexandrowitsch von Falz-Fein, who was also born in 1912.

References

1912 births
1974 deaths
Olympic bobsledders of Liechtenstein
Liechtenstein male bobsledders
Bobsledders at the 1936 Winter Olympics